Anastasia Nikolayevna Kuleshova (née Anastasia Sedova; born 4 February 1995) is a Russian cross-country skier who competes internationally with the Russian national team.

She competed at the FIS Nordic World Ski Championships 2017 in Lahti, Finland.

Cross-country skiing results
All results are sourced from the International Ski Federation (FIS).

Olympic Games
 1 medal – (1 bronze)

World Championships
 1 medal – (1 bronze)

World Cup

Season standings

Individual podiums
4 podiums – (4 )

References

External links

1995 births
Living people
People from Saransk
Russian female cross-country skiers
Cross-country skiers at the 2018 Winter Olympics
Olympic cross-country skiers of Russia
Medalists at the 2018 Winter Olympics
Olympic bronze medalists for Olympic Athletes from Russia
Olympic medalists in cross-country skiing
Tour de Ski skiers
FIS Nordic World Ski Championships medalists in cross-country skiing
Cross-country skiers at the 2012 Winter Youth Olympics
Youth Olympic gold medalists for Russia
Sportspeople from Mordovia
21st-century Russian women